Thomas Williamson (born 24 December 1984) is an English footballer who played in the Premier League for Leicester City.

Released by Leicester in 2004, he spent a year at Canvey Island and two at Grays Athletic before his contract was terminated by mutual consent on 3 August 2007. He joined Bishop's Stortford for the 2007–08 season.

In July 2008, Williamson signed for Basingstoke Town.

Honours
Grays Athletic
FA Trophy: 2005–06

References

External links

1984 births
Living people
Footballers from Leicester
English footballers
Association football midfielders
Leicester City F.C. players
Canvey Island F.C. players
Grays Athletic F.C. players
Bishop's Stortford F.C. players
Basingstoke Town F.C. players
Premier League players
National League (English football) players